Caroliniella aenescens is a species of beetle in the family Cerambycidae, and the only species in the genus Caroliniella. It was described by Blair in 1940.

Note: there appears to be a conflict with the bush cricket named Caroliniella Cadena-Castañeda, 2015 in the tribe Scudderiini.

References

Homonoeini
Beetles described in 1940